The Wyoming Whirlwind is a 1932 American western film directed by Armand Schaefer and starring Lane Chandler, Adele Lacy and Harry Todd. It was produced by the independent Willis Kent as a second feature

Synopsis
Outlaw Keene Wallace, known as The Wolf, is escaping with a payroll he has stolen when the stagecoach is attacked by Native warriors. He persuses them to return to their Reservation, saving his fellow passenger Judy Flagg in the process.

Cast
 Lane Chandler as 	Keene Wallace aka The Wolf
 Adele Lacy as 	Judy Flagg
 Harry Todd as Sheriff Joe Flagg
 Loie Bridge as Mrs. Molly Flagg, Sheriff's Wife
 Yakima Canutt as Henchman Jackson
 Al Bridge as Steve Cantrell
 Bob Roper as Henchman Brute
 Harry Semels as 	Henchman Pete
 Lafe McKee as 	Elder Townsman 
 Olin Francis as  Bartender 
 Hank Bell as 	Henchman Hank 
 Raven the Horse as 	Raven, Keene's Horse

References

Bibliography
 Pitts, Michael R. Western Movies: A Guide to 5,105 Feature Films. McFarland, 2012.

External links
 

1932 films
1932 Western (genre) films
American black-and-white films
American Western (genre) films
Films directed by Armand Schaefer
1930s English-language films
1930s American films